The Morzin Palace is a country estate in Dolní Lukavice, Czech Republic.

History 
It was the hereditary estate of  Count Karl Joseph Morzin, an aristocrat of the Austrian Empire during the 18th century. Morzin is remembered today as the first person to employ the composer Joseph Haydn as his Kapellmeister, or music director. The chateau was bought by Czechoslovak diplomat Ferdinand Veverka. In 1945 Veverka was accused of wartime collaboration with the Nazis and his estate was confiscated by the state. In the 1990s the roof was partially repaired. In 2000 the estate was returned to the Veverka family. Veverka's great grandson Zoltan Duphenieux later sought financing for more repairs.

See also 
 Morzin Palace in Prague

Notes

References 
 Kapsa, Vaclav (2012) Account books, names and music: Count Wenzel von Morzin's Virtuosissima Orchestra. Early music 40, 2012, p. 605–620, doi:10.1093/em/cas130. 
 Dies, Albert Christoph (1810) Biographical Accounts of Joseph Haydn, Vienna. English translation by Vernon Gotwals, in Gotwals (1968).
 Gotwals, Vernon (1968) Haydn: Two Contemporary Portraits, Milwaukee: University of Wisconsin Press.
 Griesinger, Georg August (1810) Biographical Notes Concerning Joseph Haydn. Leipzig: Breitkopf und Härtel. English translation by Vernon Gotwals, in Gotwals (1968).
Jones, David Wyn (2009) Oxford Composer Companions:  Haydn.  Oxford:  Oxford University Press.
 Robbins Landon, H.C. and David Wyn Jones (1988) Haydn: His Life and Music, Thames and Hudson. Biography chapters by Robbins Landon, analysis and appreciation of the works by Jones.
 Webster, James, and Georg Feder (2001), "Joseph Haydn", article in The New Grove Dictionary of Music and Musicians (New York: Grove, 2001). Published separately as a book: The New Grove Haydn (New York: Macmillan 2002). Webster is the author of the biographical section and Feder the compiler of the catalog of works.
 Webster, James. Program notes to the series of Haydn symphonies conducted by Christopher Hogwood, issued on Oiseau-Lyre; Volumes 1 and 2.

External links 
 Website of the village of Dolni-Lukavice

Palaces in the Czech Republic